Chlorphenacemide is pharmaceutical drug of the acylurea class used as an anticonvulsant.

References

Anticonvulsants
Imides
Ureas